Jacob Lungi Sørensen (born 3 March 1998) is a Danish professional footballer who plays as a midfielder for  club Norwich City.

Club career

Esbjerg fB
Sørensen made his senior league debut for Esbjerg fB on 1 December 2016 in a Danish Superliga match away to Odense. The final score was 1-0 for Esbjerg fB. During his time at the club, he made 117 appearances and scored a total of 8 goals.

Norwich City
On 20 July 2020, Sørensen signed a three-year contract with Norwich City. He made his debut against Brentford as a late replacement for Xavi Quintillà at left back, a position he had never played at before. Sørensen scored his first goal for Norwich in a 2–1 win against Nottingham Forest on 9 December. On 15 July 2021, after Norwich's Championship title winning season in which he made 32 league appearances, Sørensen signed a new contract until June 2024.

Career statistics

Club

Honours
Norwich City
EFL Championship: 2020–21

References

External links

Jakob Lungi Sørensen at DBU

1998 births
Living people
People from Esbjerg
Danish men's footballers
Denmark youth international footballers
Association football midfielders
Esbjerg fB players
Norwich City F.C. players
Danish Superliga players
Danish 1st Division players
English Football League players
Danish expatriate men's footballers
Expatriate footballers in England
Danish expatriate sportspeople in England
Sportspeople from the Region of Southern Denmark